Mariposa Grove is a sequoia grove located near Wawona, California, United States, in the southernmost part of Yosemite National Park. It is the largest grove of giant sequoias in the park, with several hundred mature examples of the tree. Two of its trees are among the 30 largest giant sequoias in the world. The grove closed on July 6, 2015, for a restoration project and reopened on June 15, 2018.

The Mariposa Grove was first visited by non-natives in 1857 when Galen Clark and Milton Mann found it. They named the grove after Mariposa County, California, where the grove is located.

The giant sequoia named Grizzly Giant is between probably 1900–2400 years old: the oldest tree in the grove. Grizzly Giant's first branch from the base is 2 m (6 ft) in diameter. Another tree, the Wawona Tree, had a tunnel cut through it in the nineteenth century that was wide enough for horse-drawn carriages and early automobiles to drive through. Weakened by the large opening at its base, the tree fell down in a storm in 1969.

Abraham Lincoln signed an Act of Congress on June 30, 1864, ceding Mariposa Grove and Yosemite Valley to the state of California. Criticism of stewardship over the land led to the state's returning the grove to federal control with the establishment of Yosemite National Park.

The Mariposa Grove Museum is listed on the National Register of Historic Places.

The grove was threatened by the Washburn Fire in July 2022.

Noteworthy trees
Some of the trees in the grove are:
 The Fallen Monarch: A giant sequoia that fell more than three hundred years ago. Giant sequoias are resistant to decay, so their remains can linger for a long period of time if undisturbed.
 The Bachelor and Three Graces: A group of four giant sequoias, three of them growing very close together, with a fourth a little more distant. Their roots are so intertwined that if one of them were to fall, it would likely bring the others along with it.
 The General Grant tree: A large giant sequoia located west of the Mariposa Grove Cabin. Not to be confused with the General Grant Tree of Sequoia National Park.
 The California Tunnel Tree: Cut in 1895 to allow coaches to pass through it (and as a marketing scheme to attract visitors to the grove), this is the only living giant sequoia tree with a tunnel in it since the fall of the Wawona Tunnel Tree in 1969 and the fall of the Pioneer Cabin Tree in 2017.
 The Faithful Couple: A rare case in which two trees grew so close together that their trunks have fused together at the base.
 The Clothespin tree: Countless fires throughout the decades nearly severed this tree's trunk, creating a space in it large enough for a pick-up truck to drive through.
 The Telescope tree: A giant sequoia tree that has become completely hollow from repeated fires through the decades. Despite that, the tree is still living, as giant sequoias do not require a whole trunk to survive. It is possible to walk inside the tree and, from there, see the sky. This condition leaves the tree weakened and makes it more difficult for it to withstand strong winds. This tree (and the Clothespin Tree) could topple at any time.
 The Galen Clark tree: Of historical importance, as it is said to be the first tree seen by Galen Clark when he entered the grove, and inspired his love for the giant sequoias and struggle for setting aside the land for preservation, a new concept in the mid-19th century.
 The Wawona Tunnel Tree: Renamed the "Fallen Tunnel Tree" after it toppled over during a snow storm in 1969. In 1881, this was the first tree to have a tunnel carved through its trunk. Its collapse is seen as a turning point in the preservation program in national parks in the United States. So grave was the shock of the tree's collapse that the result was a greater awareness of the sensitivity of ecosystems, even for a living thing as massive as the giant sequoias.
 The Fallen Giant: It was one of the largest trees in the grove, until it fell in 1873.
 The Massachusetts tree: It was one of the most famous trees in the grove. It fell in 1927.

Gallery

Museum

The Mariposa Grove Museum, also known as the Mariposa Grove Cabin, is a large cabin built in 1930. It sits in the shadow of two prominent giant sequoia trees: General Grant and General Sheridan. It was listed on the National Register of Historic Places in 1978.

The museum features numerous historic photographs and details the history of Mariposa Grove. Restrooms are inside.

See also
 List of giant sequoia groves
 List of largest giant sequoias
 List of individual trees
 Nelder Grove - a nearby giant sequoia grove.
 Galen Clark - discoverer of the Mariposa Grove
 Guardian of the Wilderness - theatrical film about Galen Clark

References

Further reading
 Geology of U.S. Parklands: Fifth Edition, Eugene P. Kiver and David V. Harris (John Wiley & Sons; New York; 1999; page 227)

External links

Mariposa Grove of Giant Sequoias - Yosemite National Park
Yosemite and the Mariposa Grove: A Preliminary Report, 1865, California State
"Mariposa Grove", National Geographic Society
Record from the 38th Congress, 1864 Act granting the grove to California
Record from the 59th Congress, Act returning the grove to federal control
Short radio episode Samoset about John Muir showing Ralph Waldo Emerson the Mariposa Grove, from The Life and Letters of John Muir, 1923. California Legacy Project.

Giant sequoia groves
Sequoiadendron
Yosemite National Park
Protected areas of Mariposa County, California